Sydney Howard Smith (3 February 1872 – 27 March 1947) was a British tennis and badminton player.

Career
Sydney Smith was the first All England Badminton Men's Singles champion in 1900. He reached his first Wimbledon singles final in 1899, beating Herbert Roper Barrett in an epic five set semi final before losing the all comers final to Arthur Gore in four sets. In 1900 Smith beat Gore in the all comers final at Wimbledon, before losing to Reginald Doherty in the challenge round in four sets. In 1905, Smith beat Holcombe Ward, Wilberforce Eaves, William Larned and Major Ritchie before losing the all comers final in five sets to Norman Brookes. Smith and partner Frank Riseley won the Gentlemen's Doubles title at Wimbledon in 1902 and 1906. He was a member of the British Davis Cup team in 1905 and 1906. 

His other career highlights included winning the Welsh Championships singles title ten times (1896–1906), the Northern Lawn Tennis Championships singles title seven consecutive times (1899–1905) and the Sussex Championships six times (1899–1902, 1904–1905), the Burton-on-Trent Open three times (1897–1899).

The Mixed Doubles Trophy, a silver challenge cup and cover presented to the winners of the mixed doubles at Wimbledon, was gifted to the All England Club by Smith's family.

Grand Slam finals

Singles: 1 runner-up

Doubles: 5 (2 titles, 3 runners-up)

References

External links 
 
 
 
 Biography
 All England Champions 1899-2007

19th-century English people
19th-century male tennis players
English male badminton players
English male tennis players
People from Stroud
1872 births
1947 deaths
Grand Slam (tennis) champions in men's doubles
Tennis people from Gloucestershire
British male tennis players
Wimbledon champions (pre-Open Era)